The Doctor's Secret is a 1929 American drama film directed by William C. deMille and written by William C. deMille. The film stars Ruth Chatterton, H. B. Warner, John Loder, Robert Edeson, Wilfred Noy and Ethel Wales. It is based on the 1913 play Half an Hour by J. M. Barrie. The film was released on January 26, 1929, by Paramount Pictures. As part of the policy of multiple-language versions during the early sound era, a separate Swedish version was produced at the Joinville Studios in Paris and released the following year.

Synopsis
Young Englishwoman Lillian Garson is unhappy with her marriage and decides to elope with another man. However he is killed in a car accident and she returns home to her husband and tries to carry on as if nothing had happened. Only the doctor who shows up at their house for dinner that night, and who dealt with the crash, knows the truth.

Cast 
Ruth Chatterton as Lillian Garson
H. B. Warner as Richard Garson
John Loder as Hugh Paton
Robert Edeson as Dr. Brodie
Wilfred Noy as Mr. Redding
Ethel Wales as Mrs. Redding
Nanci Price as Susie
Frank Finch Smiles as Wethers

References

Bibliography
 Crafton, Donald. The Talkies: American Cinema's Transition to Sound, 1926-1931. University of California Press, 1999.

External links 
 

1929 films
1920s English-language films
American drama films
1929 drama films
Paramount Pictures films
Films based on works by J. M. Barrie
Films directed by William C. deMille
American black-and-white films
Films set in London
1920s American films